Jack Geran (1929-2021) was an international speedway rider from Australia.

Speedway career 
Geran reached the final of the Speedway World Championship on two occasions in the 1957 Individual Speedway World Championship and the 1958 Individual Speedway World Championship.

He rode in the top tier of British Speedway from 1952-1964, riding for various clubs.

World Final Appearances

Individual World Championship
 1957 -  London, Wembley Stadium - 10th - 7pts
 1958 -  London, Wembley Stadium - 14th - 3pts

References 

1929 births
2021 deaths
Australian speedway riders
Poole Pirates riders
Exeter Falcons riders
Leicester Hunters riders
Oxford Cheetahs riders